The tail-spot wrasse, Halichoeres melanurus, is a species of wrasse in the western Pacific from Japan to Samoa and Tonga and south to the Great Barrier Reef. It can reach  in total length. This species is popular for display in public aquaria and can be found in the aquarium trade.

The male of the species is more vibrant in colour generally, and when placed in the vicinity of one or more females may "flash" his colours with dramatically increased intensity. The female can be easily differentiated from the male by the presence of ocelli markings (eye spots) on the dorsal and caudal fins.

References

External links
 

Tail-spot wrasse
Taxa named by Pieter Bleeker 
Fish described in 1851